Maurice Edelbaum (1906–1984) was an American criminal lawyer from New York.

Edelbaum was born in Brooklyn, New York. He was educated in New York City public schools before graduating from Fordham University School of Law in 1928. In 1967, Edelbaum served as a lawyer for Stephen H. Kessler, a former medical student who was found not guilty by reason of insanity after being charged with murdering his mother-in-law. The same year, Edelbaum also was a lawyer for John (Sonny) Franzese, a bank robber in Colombo crime group. Two years later, Edelbaum defended a Tammany Hall leader, De Sapio. Despite his attempt to prove his innocence, De Sapio was found guilty of conspiracy to bribe a water commissioner and extort contracts from Consolidated Edison. His sentence was set to two years in prison. Edelbaum was also notoriously known for his defense of Anthony Provenzano. Edelbaum died on August 10, 1984, in Washington Manor Nursing Home in Hollywood, Florida.

References

1906 births
1984 deaths
Fordham University School of Law alumni
Lawyers from Brooklyn
Lawyers from New York City
20th-century American lawyers